The Altruist is a 2004 thriller film, written and directed by Mick McCleery. The film stars Billy Franks as Nick Andrews, the founder of a company called Terminal Assist, which matches up thrill killers and people who want to commit suicide. The supporting cast includes Bobbi Ashton, John Innocenzo, and Mike Mclaughlin.

Plot

The film opens as Terminal Assist "matches" a depressed man named Tom Taylor (Larry Schneider Jr.) with a killer.  Tom waits downstairs for his all-too-willing executioner. Things go awry when the killer decides to murder Tom's wife, too, and the resulting double homicide is all over the local news.

This doesn't suit the purposes of Terminal Assist, an altruistic service that strives to hook up terminally ill people with low-life hit men that enjoy killing. Founder Nick Andrews (Franks) has established a working relationship with local police authorities, based on an understanding that they won't kill anyone living in the same community. The double homicide presents problems, and the police expect Nick to find a way to relieve the pressure. Complications ensue when it's soon apparent that Nick has a thing for the grieving widow Teresa (Bobbi Ashton), and he has competition—namely, Tom's doctor buddy Carl (John Innocenzo).

Carl has a different problem. He's falsified medical reports and hidden his diagnosis of pancreatic cancer that allowed Tom to obtain a lucrative insurance policy before his expiration date. He certainly doesn't want an investigation into Tom's death with potential criminal charges and license revocation pending.

Production

In an interview with the website 'buried.com' McCleery gave some background on the conception of the idea for The Altruist.  While shooting Track 16 in the summer of 1998 (also starring Franks and Ashton), director Mick McCleery read an article about the statistics of murders and suicides each year in the USA. He was surprised that the suicide rate was double that of the murder rate (an average of 60,000 versus 30,000). He wrote a note to himself about it: "That is an awful lot of waste there, if only someone could match those two groups up", and the basic plot of The Altruist was born.

McCleery continued to work on the idea as he finished up post-production on Track 16 and was ready to shoot this new film in the summer of 2002. Leading man Billy Franks, who is British, flew over to America for the shoot, and was promptly deported. His passport had been out of order for years, and in pre-9/11 days they simply let him through, but things had changed by 2002.

Instead of recasting, McCleery rescheduled the film for the following summer, hoping that Franks' passport issues could be worked out by then. He used the time to rework the script, changing several subplots.

Premiere

The Altruist premiered at The Ritz cinema in Voorhees, NJ on November 4, 2004. Just four days later it premiered in London at the Clapham Picture House (November 8, 2004).

External links
 
 

2004 films
2004 psychological thriller films
American psychological thriller films
2000s English-language films
2000s American films